Víctor Rivera (born 5 November 1965) is a Puerto Rican judoka. He competed in the men's half-lightweight event at the 1988 Summer Olympics.

References

1965 births
Living people
Puerto Rican male judoka
Olympic judoka of Puerto Rico
Judoka at the 1988 Summer Olympics
Place of birth missing (living people)
Pan American Games medalists in judo
Pan American Games bronze medalists for Puerto Rico
Judoka at the 1987 Pan American Games
Medalists at the 1987 Pan American Games
20th-century Puerto Rican people